Women of Algiers in Their Apartment  is a 1980 novel by the Algerian writer Assia Djebar. It is a collection of short stories celebrating the strength and dignity of Algerian women of the past and the present. It interweaves the stories of the lives of three Muslim Algerian women. Assia Djebar's inspiration to write Femmes d'Alger dans leur appartement came from Delacroix's painting The Women of Algiers.

Plot 
The book is a collection of short stories about the lives of pre-colonial, colonial, and postcolonial women at various levels of Algerian society. It is a work about the compartmentalization of women in Algeria and the "harems"—social, economic, symbolic—into which they are placed.

Footnotes

External links
 BNET Research Center Review
 University of Virginia Press Article
 Arabesques Review
 

1980 novels
French-language novels
Novels by Assia Djebar
Novels set in Algeria